Martin Anderson may refer to:

Martin Anderson (artist), (1854–1932) Scottish artist, political cartoonist, postcard illustrator, and publisher
Martin Anderson (economist) (1936–2015), author and policy advisor to U.S. President Ronald Reagan
Martin Brewer Anderson (1815–1890), American university president
Martin Anderson case, about Martin Anderson, (1992–2006), teenager who died of mistreatment by boot camp officers in Tampa, Florida

See also
Martin Andersen (disambiguation)
Martin Andersson (disambiguation)